The Ross E. Templeton Physical Education Center is a 2,300-seat multi-purpose arena in Clinton, South Carolina. It was built in 1975 and is home to the Presbyterian College Blue Hose men's and women's basketball, volleyball, and wrestling teams. The center bears the name of the late Ross E. Templeton.

See also
 List of NCAA Division I basketball arenas

External links
Facility information

College basketball venues in the United States
Sports venues in South Carolina
Indoor arenas in South Carolina
Sports venues completed in 1975
Sports venues in Laurens County, South Carolina
Presbyterian College
Basketball venues in South Carolina